= Phil Lowe (author) =

American author

- Occupation: Author
- Notable work: Waltzing in Triolet

Phil Lowe is an American author most noted for his book Waltzing in Triolet.

== Career ==
Now an author at the age of 84, Lowe had already spent the greater part of his life in the work force. Lowe was born into a religious family. By the age of 12, he started questioning the orthodox beliefs.

Lowe's father retired early due to poor health. This led Lowe to start working on the weekends as well as evening, part-time, to be able to complete high school. As a result, he experienced labour and the work force before any formal education. When he left high school, he got a job in an X-ray department where worked in the dark room and had to bring patients on wheel chairs to be X-rayed. He dated and married a colleague at this job. After marrying, he was drafted into the United States Army and went to the Chaplains Assistance School, upon completion of his basic training. He then became an assistant to Chaplain Merlin R Carothers who helped him further in finding the answers to his questions. After retirement Chaplin Carothers started the Praise Foundations in Escondido CA that has distributed thousands of books across the country to Jails and prisons. His most read book, Prison to Praise, has sold over a million. Carothers died in November 2013 and his wife, Mary, continued as director of the Foundation of Praise.

After he completed his tenure with the military, he spent the next 36 years of his life making a living as a salesman and later sales manager in the field of industrial tools. He observed how the business world was harbouring materialism. This renewed his old questions about the purpose of life. He was eventually introduced to nature photography by a friend which he took up as a hobby. As he captured the images of nature from various trails, he realized that he had been reading the book that the Creator wrote. He published this compilation in his book, Waltzing in Triolet, which became highly notable.

== Books ==
- Waltzing in Triolet. Xlibris Us, 9 September 2008.
- Say it a Different Way.
- Fishing for Snakes and Baking Apple Pies.
- Stalking Awareness.
